Indrapuri is A Town in Bhopal, India, in the BHEL township in the city of Bhopal.

Etymology
Indra is King of the demi-gods or Devas and Lord of Heaven or Svargaloka in Hindu mythology. He is also the God of War, Storms, and Rainfall. Alkapuri (incidentally, another locality in Bhopal) is another name of Swarga and is also called Indrapuri (Indra's estate).

Neighbourhoods in Bhopal